Coin-operated-locker babies or coin-locker babies are victims of child abuse of a kind often occurring in Japan, in which infants are left in public lockers. There are two main variables that account for the differences in frequency and the type of these child abuse cases: social and economical. Predominantly neonates and male babies, the murder of infants became a form of population control in Japan, being discovered 1-3 months after death, wrapped in plastic and appearing to have died of asphyxiation.  The presumption is that such lockers are regularly checked by attendants and the infant will be found quickly; however, many children are found dead. Between 1980 and 1990, there were 191 reported cases of infants which died in coin-operated lockers, which represents about six percent of all infanticides during that period.

Hydrostatic lung tests, stomach and bowel tests can be performed by medical examiners or forensic pathologists, but months after death it may be impossible to ascertain the cause of death because of decomposition. In Japan, if a baby is determined to have been born alive, the mother is investigated on charges of homicide and abandonment of a corpse. However, if the dead baby is proven to have been stillborn, the mother is investigated on a charge of abandonment. If the assailant is discovered, she is rarely sentenced because she is considered to have been in a mentally unusual situation during and after the pregnancy. The grounds for this judgment has a historical precedent.

Osaka's government organized a group specifically designed to deal with the detection and protection of abused and neglected children. In 1993, they published a manual on how to deal with child abuse, but the Japanese judicial administration still uses old laws for abuse cases. 

In response to certain actions, in 1981, the number of cases began to decrease. These actions included the relocation of coin-lockers to make them more visible, with additional patrol assigned to monitor the locker locations. Further, the publication of the term and problem led to the recognition by the general public in Japan, leading to stronger education about contraception to decrease the number of unwanted babies.  Though the Osaka government organized group created programs, such as  Baby Hatch, this is still a prevalent issue in Japan. In Kumamoto prefecture, Jikei hospital’s baby hatch program, “Konotori no yurikago [stork’s cradle]”, modeled after German Babyklappen, was said to encourage child abandonment after news that a three-year-old child was left on the first day of operation on May 10th, 2007, increasing criticism of the program.   

An adoption system. proposed by Noboru Kikuta, that protected the biological mothers’ records of child birth and adoption had also been proposed but was not recognized in the special adoption system in 1987.

During the 1970s, reported cases of coin-locker babies increased along with other news of maternal filicide. The women’s liberation movement, ūman ribu, was concerned with the biased treatment against criminalized mothers and criticized Japan’s family institution. They interpreted maternal filicide as a violent reaction against being forced into socially accepted spousal and maternal roles.

Reasons for occurrence

Isolation and poverty 
In many cases, the abandoners are individuals who have struggled financially and would not be able to support their baby. They may have come from homes of violence or neglect themselves, growing up in isolation and causing them to have a reluctance to use public services. In the reality of the contemporary society in Japan, it is difficult for women to earn enough money to support a child, and many women would need to turn to the sex industry.

Age 
The people who leave children in coin-operated-lockers can be a variety of ages, and this is a social factor that plays a large part in the child abandonment problem in Japan.

Taboo 
There exists a taboo of sex, abortion, and unwanted pregnancies within the Japanese culture that contribute to the problem of child abandonment in Japan, making the solution of the coin-operated-locker much more attractive.

Laws in place 
In 1981, the number of coin-operated-locker babies began to decrease because the following actions (1)Coin-operated-lockers were relocated to make them more visible and patrols were assigned to monitor these areas, (2) The problem of coin-operated-locker babies was publicised and became recognised by the general population, and (3) Education about contraception, as a form of birth control to a wider number of people, decreased the number of unwanted babies.

Aside from this, recently, the government of Osaka created a group designed to focus specifically on the abuse and protection of abused and neglected children, publishing a manual on how to deal with child abuse in 1993. 

Despite the measures in place to stop the occurrence of this type of child abuse, coin-operated-locker babies are still found today. The classifications of the crimes are as follows: 

 If the baby was a stillborn baby it is not considered child abuse.
 If the baby was born alive and: (a) was killed soon after birth, then abandoned, it’s considered homicide; (b) if the baby is killed several days after birth, it’s considered homicide and neglect; and (c ) if the baby is found alive, but abandoned in the coin-operated-locker, it is considered severe neglect. 

The existing laws in place to protect children from child abuse prevent many professionals from taking action. However, because the number of child abuse social workers are understaffed, they’re poorly paid and overworked, resulted in the neglect and abuse of babies in Japan. These reasons have also been the reason as to why many do not want to go into the field.

Baby hatches and child abandonment in Japan 
In response to the high child abandonment rate in Japan, Jikei Hospital introduced the idea of establishing the nation’s first “Baby Hatch.” A baby hatch or baby box is a place where people, typically mothers can bring babies, usually newborn, and abandon them anonymously in a safe place to be found and cared for. The idea was made public in late 2006. Based on similar services found in Italy, Germany and South Korea, Jikei Hospital argued that the rate of abandonment would decrease by providing custody for children whose parents cannot give sufficient care. Under the official name Kounotori no Yurikago, “White Stork’s Cradle,” the system has been in operation since May 2007. In its 13 years of operation, Kounotori no Yurikago has taken care of 155 babies (as of March 2020). Children in the hospital’s custody are eventually sent further to other institutions or foster care.

Timeline of recent cases 

 May 2nd 1999: A Japanese couple left their five month old child in a coin operated locker in Kawasaki Tokyo to go eat a late night snack. They told the police they thought the child would be safe because air could get into the locker. She was held there for more than 30 minutes. 
 31st May 2018: A newborn baby girl’s corpse was found inside a coin locker in the Kabukicho in the Shinjuku area of Tokyo. The infant still had her umbilical cord attached wrapped in a vinyl bag in a suitcase. The infant had been strangled, and was dead for a week before the police found her. 
 26th September 2018: Tokyo police arrest a 49-year old woman by the name of Emiri Suzaki was suspected of leaving her stillborn baby in a coin-operated locker at Uguisudani Station in Tokyo for several years, after turning herself into the police and confessing. Panicking after not giving birth to a living child, she kept the body as she “could not dispose of it”, continuing to pay the storage fees throughout the years. After leaving the home of a male acquaintance after an argument, Suzaki left the key and confessed, afraid her friend would discover the body in the locker. 
 June 6th 2021: A body of a gender unknown newborn was found in a coin operated locker at a shopping center at JR Ofuna Station in the Kamakura, Kanagawa Prefecture in Japan. The identity of the person who left the baby has not been found. 
 June 10th 2022: A 22-year-old was arrested in Hokkaido for leaving the body of a new born baby in the coin operated lockers at Chitose station. Ayano Koseki admitted to the charges, investigating the relationships between the woman and the baby, who was stored in a cooler.

References in pop-culture 
Coin operated locker babies are mentioned in songs and novels, most prominently in MARETU’s first album titled “Coin Locker Baby”. The album contains a song with the same name, sung by Hatsune Miku. The singer expresses her conflicting feelings as a parent that has chosen to abandon her child in a locker. Another noteworthy mention is in Ryū Murakami’s book also titled “Coin Locker babies”, a coming-of-age story that follows two boys abandoned in adjacent train station lockers as they set off for the city to destroy the woman that first abandoned them. In the video game Yakuza: Like a Dragon, both the main hero and the main villain were abandoned in coin lockers, and the legacy of this shared trauma shapes the plot and the decisions of both characters, as well as those of the parents who abandoned them.

See also
 Baby hatch
 Coin Locker Babies (novel)

References 

Child abandonment
Poverty in Japan
Infanticide
Childhood in Japan